William Brooks Ching (October 2, 1913 – July 1, 1989) was an American character actor who appeared in numerous films and on television during the later 1940s and 1950s. Ching may be best known for his supporting role in Rudolph Maté's 1950 film noir, D.O.A.  along with his role as the overbearing boyfriend of Katharine Hepburn's character in George Cukor's 1952 comedy Pat and Mike.

Early years
Ching was born in St. Louis and raised in New Orleans. During World War II, he served in the Coast Guard.

Career 
Ching began his career as a professional singer, starring in a summer series at the Memphis Open Air Theater. He appeared in musical comedies such as Rodgers and Hammerstein's Allegro (1947). His first film role was in 1946. He signed with Republic Pictures in 1947, and for the next dozen years, acted mostly in Westerns and dramas. Ching declined to change his name at the time of his move to films, though it might give the mistaken impression that he was of Asian descent.

He appeared in the Randolph Scott Western Tall Man Riding (1955). The same year, Ching was cast as Clint Allbright on CBS's Our Miss Brooks. In 1958, he played murderer Glenn McKay in the Perry Mason episode, "The Case of the Corresponding Corpse". His last major acting credit was in a 1959 episode of the television series 77 Sunset Strip.

Death
In 1989, at age 75, Ching died of congestive heart failure. He is buried at Fairhaven Memorial Park in Santa Ana, California.

Partial filmography

The Mysterious Mr. M (1946, Serial) - Jim Farrell [Chs. 1-3]
I'll Be Yours (1947) - Stage Door Johnny (uncredited)
The Michigan Kid (1947) - Steve Randolph Prescott
Song of Scheherazade (1947) - Midshipman (uncredited)
Buck Privates Come Home (1947) - 2nd Lieutenant, Mess Officer (uncredited)
Something in the Wind (1947) - Joe (uncredited)
The Wistful Widow of Wagon Gap (1947) - Jim Simpson
Life of St. Paul Series (1949) - Jailer
D.O.A. (1950) - Halliday
In a Lonely Place (1950) - Ted Barton
The Showdown (1950) - Mike Shattay
Surrender (1950) - John Beauregard Hale
Belle Le Grand (1951) - Bill Shanks
Oh! Susanna (1951) - Corporal Donlin
The Sea Hornet (1951) - Sprowl
The Wild Blue Yonder (1951) - Lt. Ted Cranshaw
Bal Tabarin (1952) - Don Barlow
Pat and Mike (1952) - Collier Weld
Never Wave at a WAC (1953) - Lt. Col. Schuyler 'Sky' Fairchild
Scared Stiff (1953) - Tony Warren
The Moonlighter (1953) - Tom Anderson
Give a Girl a Break (1953) - Anson Prichett
The Magnificent Matador (1955) - Jody Wilton
Tall Man Riding (1955) - Rex Willard
Terror in the Haunted House (1958) - Mark Snell
Escort West (1959) - Capt. Howard Poole

References

External links
 
 

1913 births
1989 deaths
American male musical theatre actors
American male film actors
American male television actors
Male Western (genre) film actors
Male actors from St. Louis
20th-century American male actors
20th-century American singers
20th-century American male singers